This is the discography of Jonas Blue, an English DJ, record producer and remixer. His debut studio album, Blue, was released in November 2018 and peaked at number thirty-three on the UK Albums Chart.

Albums

Studio albums

Compilation albums

Singles

Guest appearances

Production and songwriting credits

Remixes

Notes

References 

Discographies of British artists